"I Belong to You" is a 1991 song recorded by American singer Whitney Houston for her third studio album, I'm Your Baby Tonight (1990). It was written by Derek Bramble and Franne Golde, produced by Narada Michael Walden, and was released on October 18, 1991, as the album's fifth single. "I Belong to You" was a Top 10 hit on the US Billboard R&B chart, and also charted in the UK and the Netherlands. The song garnered Houston a nomination for Best Female R&B Vocal Performance at the 35th Grammy Awards (1993).

Critical reception
Larry Flick from Billboard wrote that Houston "delivers a mature and restrained vocal within a lush, urban-angled swing/R&B arrangement." He noted its "contagious chorus". A reviewer from Music & Media said that "the hip hop-shaped beat is more raw than the melody line, reminiscent of Beats International's 'Dub Be Good to Me'. Vintage Houston." 

Alan Jones from Music Week viewed it as "a pleasant but unexceptional soul shuffle". James Hunter of Rolling Stone commented that the song "acts out its claim in a penthouse bedroom", and described its production by Narada Michael Walden as "high-end grooves accented by pinballing counterrhythms."

Music video
The music video for "I Belong to You" features some shots from "My Name Is Not Susan", that are extended and/or unreleased in the video to that song. Former heavyweight champion Mike Tyson was featured in the video and was also featured in "My Name is Not Susan" as well. The video also includes footage from Houston's I'm Your Baby Tonight World Tour (1991).

Track listings and formats

 UK 12" vinyl
 "I Belong to You" (Shep Pettibone Remix Edit) — 4:32 B 	
 "I Belong to You" (UK Remix Edit) — 4:48 A 	
 "I Belong to You" (Album Version) — 5:28 	
 "One Moment in Time" — 4:42 	

 UK CD maxi-single
 "I Belong to You" (Album Version Edit) — 4:40
 "I Belong to You" (UK Remix Edit) — 4:49 A
 "I Belong to You" (Shep Pettibone Remix Edit) — 4:32 B
 "One Moment in Time" — 4:42
A Additional Production and Remix by John WaddellB Additional Production and Remix by Shep Pettibone

 US 7" vinyl
 "I Belong to You" (Album Version Edit) — 4:41  
 "I Belong to You" (International Remix) — 4:52 A

 US, UK 12" vinyl
 "I Belong to You" (UK Mix) — 8:55 A
 "I Belong to You" (UK Dub) — 8:45 A
 "I Belong to You" (69th Street Mix) — 9:27 B
 "I Belong to You" (69th Street Dub) — 4:16 B

Charts

Personnel
Credits
Lead vocals, backing vocals, vocal arrangement — Whitney Houston
Producer, arranger — Narada Michael Walden
Additional production and remix — John Waddell
Post production and remix — Shep Pettibone
Executive producer — Clive Davis

References

External links

Whitney Houston songs
1990 songs
Songs written by Franne Golde
Song recordings produced by Narada Michael Walden
1991 singles
Contemporary R&B ballads
Arista Records singles
Pop ballads
1990s ballads
Soul ballads
New jack swing songs